Wangan may refer to:

Wangan-sen, or Bayshore Route, a stretch of toll highway in Greater Tokyo, noted for street racing
Wangan Midnight, Japanese anime/manga/video game series
Isewangan Expressway in Ise, Japan
Wangan, Penghu, township in Penghu County (the Pescadores), Taiwan centered around Wangan Island
Wangan, Queensland, a town in Queensland, Australia
Wangan people, an ethnic group of Queensland, Australia
wannigan a floating cookhouse